Billman is an English and Swedish surname, a variant of the German Toponymic surname Billmann or Bellman, a name denoting a dweller by the Bille River near Hamburg. Notable people with the surname include:

George Billman (born 1954), American physiologist
John Billman (1919–2012), American football player
Mark Billman (1905–1933), American racecar driver
Torsten Billman (1909–1989), Swedish artist

See also
Willi Billmann (1911–2001), German footballer

English-language surnames
German-language surnames